Air Miles is a group of loyalty programs operated by different companies in each region where the brand operates. The programs are available in Canada, the Netherlands and the Middle East. Points are earned on purchases at participating merchants and can be redeemed against flights with specific airlines.

History 

The Air Miles concept was created by Sir Keith Mills and began operating in the UK in November 1988. British company Loyalty Management Group (LMG) operated the program and licensed the rights to it in other countries to other operators.

LMG was later acquired by Canadian firm Group Aeroplan, now Aimia, which retains the intellectual property associated with the Air Miles name and logo internationally and is the majority partner in the Air Miles program in the Middle East. In all other countries in which Air Miles programs operate, Aimia is the licensor and is not involved in program operation. In Canada, Air Miles competes directly with Aimia's former program, Aeroplan. Similarly, the former Air Miles program in the UK had no affiliation with the Nectar program operated by Aimia.

Air Miles Canada 
Currently owned and operated by Bank of Montreal, after signing a deal with LoyaltyOne to acquire it March 10th, 2023. The Air Miles reward program was launched in Canada in 1992 and is Canada's largest coalition loyalty program.  In 1998, Air Miles Canada was acquired by Alliance Data Systems.  In 2008, Alliance Data Loyalty Services became known as Loyalty One.

Air Miles Canada has a number of sponsors, including Bank of Montreal, American Express, retail partners such as Shell Canada, Metro, Jean Coutu pharmacies, and the Eastlink cable company. Their online partners such as Amazon and eBay are available through their shopping portal Airmiles shops. Consumers collect Air Miles reward miles from sponsors, which can be redeemed for 1,200 reward choices, such as travel, entertainment, home electronics and gift cards. Consumers get the best value for their Air Miles when they use them for travel for Dream Rewards or promotions for Cash Rewards in stores.  

In April 2009, Air Miles Canada launched My Planet, an initiative to help people trade in their Air Miles for environmentally conscious products and services. Initially, My Planet offered collectors over 140 "green" redemption items, including public transit passes, organic cotton linens, and electric scooters. In September 2009, the program was extended to stores and point of purchase.

Air Miles Canada has received awards for marketing, customer care/call centers, human resources, training and leadership.

On October 4, 2021, Air Miles introduced a series of revisions to the program.

On January 31, 2021, Lowe's and its subsidiaries Rona, Inc and Réno-Dépôt officially ended their partnership with Air Miles. As of February 1, 2021; all of their retail and online stores stopped accepting Air Miles.

On March 31, 2021, Liquor Control Board of Ontario ended their partnership with Air Miles and stopped accepting Air Miles at all of their retail and online store. 

In 2022, Staples Canada and the parent of Sobeys and Safeway stores ended their partnerships with Air Miles.  Staples stopped accepting Air Miles cards in July of that year, and Sobeys and Safeway stores will begin phasing out acceptance of Air Miles after August 10, 2022.

On March 10, 2023, Air Miles' owner filed for bankruptcy, and entered in to purchase agreement with Bank of Montreal, subject to court approval.

2016 points cancellation 
In 2011, Air Miles Canada announced that points earned by Canadian collectors would expire after five years. All points collected from inception to the end of 2011 would expire at midnight on 1 January 2017. The announcement generally went unnoticed at the time.

In 2016, as the deadline for redeeming points came closer, the media began to report on Canadian collectors struggling to redeem their points, frustrations with customer service, accusations that reward offers were being manipulated to discourage redemption and that merchandise was being hidden from some customers.

On 1 December, 30 days before the expiry deadline, Loyalty One reversed the policy, citing an impending Private Members Bill in the Legislative Assembly of Ontario that would ban the expiration of points in the Province of Ontario.

It is estimated Air Miles intended to gain an estimated $180 to 250 million, due to the expiration of points (CAD), for the balance sheet of its parent company, US-based Alliance Data. The cancellation resulted in a US$242 million charge against fourth quarter 2016 earnings.

Air Miles Middle East 

In the Middle East region, Air Miles is operated by Rewards Management Middle East. It is owned by Aimia (formerly Groupe Aeroplan). It operates a single program across the United Arab Emirates, Qatar and Bahrain. Air Miles offers all of its members a wealth of rewards and unique offers and experiences. Since the launch in 2001, over 1.4 million members have enrolled from across the UAE, Qatar and Bahrain. Members collect Air Miles on everyday shopping from a huge range of partners including HSBC, Spinneys, Sharaf DG, Damas, Chilli's, African & Eastern and many more. Members who are HSBC credit cardholders are credited Air Miles for credit card transactions.

Air Miles Netherlands 

Air Miles was first brought to the attention of potential business partners in the Netherlands by Keith Mills, Liam Cowdrey and Philip Beard during 1993, by way of an introduction from a senior ABN AMRO bank executive who had come across Air Miles during his international travels. In early 1994, Robert Gierkink was hired away from Air Miles Canada to lead an Amsterdam-based start-up team consisting of Todd Almeida, Frank Fisser, Fred Metman and Renee Belloni.

ABN AMRO, Albert Heijn, Shell, Vroom & Dreesmann and KLM were contractually confirmed as anchor partners during the summer and the Air Miles programme launched via a massive advertising campaign in October 1994. The program enjoyed immediate success, with millions of Dutch households enrolling into the program before year's end. More than a dozen additional retailers also joined the Air Miles program just prior to --- or within a year --- following the launch. These included Praxis, Etos, Gall & Gall, Blokker, Hunkemoller, Videoland and several others. Similar to other Air Miles programs, Air Miles in the Netherlands originally included flights. But it also added a handful of other travel and leisure rewards. The initial rewards were KLM, Center Parcs, NS (Dutch Rail), Stena Line, Efteling and Noorder Dierenpark Emmen. In 1998, the reward program was expanded to include a wide-ranging catalogue of merchandise redemption options. The program's popularity later waned starting in 2004, when ABN AMRO ceased its participation. Albert Heijn subsequently limited its issuance of Air Miles just to private-label products to allow for greater product discounting via its Bonus Card program. At Shell gas stations, customers can choose between Air Miles or stamps. Currently Air Miles has over 3.8 million active users, making it the largest loyalty program in the Netherlands.

Air Miles Netherlands has announced that their points will expire after the 5-year mark for its customers starting in 2018.

Former programs

Air Miles United Kingdom 

Air Miles in the UK was created in the mid-1980s by Alan Deller, Commercial Director of British Caledonian Airways and the partners of advertising agency Mills, Smith & Partners – initially Keith Mills, Brian Smith, William Kershaw, Nick Tomlin, Peter Badham and Geoffrey Bean and later Liam Cowdrey. Together they formed the Air Miles Travel Promotions Limited in 1986 and sold 51% of the UK operation to British Airways soon after.  They produced the consumer launch campaign "Stop dreaming. Start Collecting", gaining a database of three million Air Miles collectors in the first three months. Keith Mills later founded the Nectar loyalty card. Operations in the UK commenced in November 1988.

In 2007, the United Kingdom Air Miles business had eight million customers. Airmiles could be collected through Lloyds TSB Airmiles Duo credit card accounts, Shell petrol stations, Tesco supermarkets (50 airmiles for every £2.50 in Tesco Club Card vouchers), Southern Electric, travel products, package holidays purchased from Air Miles and over 100 online retailers.

The British program had an online shopping portal including retailers such as eBay and Currys. Airmiles could be redeemed for flights with British Airways and other airlines, Eurostar and ferry crossings, cruises, hotel accommodation, car hire, travel insurance, package holidays, spa and golf breaks and leisure activities. It was based in Crawley.

Air Miles was a subsidiary of British Airways, but the airline also operated a different scheme for its frequent flyers called BA Miles.

In September 2011 Air Miles announced that it would be re branding to Avios and that taxes and charges would then be chargeable, quoting £497 for a return flight to Sydney; many previous users expressed regret and anger over this. The Airmiles scheme was combined with BA Miles and ended at midnight 14 November.

Air Miles United States 
An Air Miles program was launched in the United States in 1992 by Loyalty Management Group. Participating companies included Lenscrafters, General Cinema, AT&T Corporation, and Citibank. Unlike its Canadian counterpart, the U.S. program was unsuccessful and suspended operations in May 1993.

References 

1986 establishments in the United Kingdom
Aimia (company)
Companies based in Crawley
Companies established in 1986
Customer loyalty programs
Customer loyalty programs in Canada
Companies that have filed for bankruptcy in Canada
Companies that filed for Chapter 11 bankruptcy in 2023